Leif Johan Sevland (born 13 September 1961 in Avaldsnes) is a Norwegian politician for the Conservative Party.

He served as a deputy representative to the Norwegian Parliament from Rogaland during the terms 1985–1989 and 1993–1997.

On the local level, Sevland has been mayor of Stavanger from 1995-2011. From 1987 to 1999 he was also a member of Rogaland county council. He chaired the party chapter in Stavanger from 1989 to 1994 and the county chapter from 1994 to 1998.

He graduated from Rogaland University College (now named University of Stavanger) in 1983. Before entering politics he worked at the trotting track Forus, from 1989 to 1994 as manager.

He is married to Anne Selnes.

References

1961 births
Living people
Conservative Party (Norway) politicians
Deputy members of the Storting
Mayors of places in Rogaland
Politicians from Stavanger
People from Karmøy
University of Stavanger alumni